Rajan is an Indian masculine given name and surname.

Notable people with this given name

 Rajan Bakhshi, Indian Army General officer
 Rajan Bala (1946–2009), Indian columnist
 Rajan Batra (born 1976), Indian film producer
 Rajan Batta, Indian-American engineer
 Rajan P. Dev (1951–2009), Indian film actor
 Rajan Devadas (1921–2014), American-Indian photojournalist
 Rajan Gurukkal (born 1948), Indian historian
 Rajan Hoole, Sri Lankan mathematician
 Rajan Ishan (born 1978), Nepali singer
 Rajan Kadiragamar (1922–2011), Ceylonese flag officer
 Rajan Khosa, Indian writer
 Rajan Koran (born 1981), Malaysian footballer
 Rajan Madhav (born 1975), Indian film director and screenwriter
 Rajan Mahadevan (born 1978), Indian playback singer
 Rajan Mahtani (born 1948), Zambian business magnate
 Rajan Mehra (1993-2010), Indian cricket umpire
 Rajan Menon (born 1953), Indian political scientist
 Rajan Mittal (born 1960), Indian entrepreneur
 Rajan Mukarung (born 1978), Nepali writer
 Rajan Pallan (born 1965), Indian politician
 Rajan Pavlovic (born 1976), Australian handball player
 Rajan Pillai (1947–1995), Indian businessman
 Rajan Rai, Nepali singer and film producer director
 Rajan Raje (born 1957), Indian activist
 Rajan Salvi, Indian politician
 Rajan Sankaradi (1953-2016), Indian film director
 Rajan Sankaranarayanan (born 1968), Indian biologist
 Rajan Sarma (born 1956), Tamil film director
 Rajan Sawhney (born 1970–71), Canadian politician
 Rajan Saxena, Indian writer
 Rajan Saxena (physician), Indian medical doctor
 Rajan Seth (born 1952), Indian cricket umpire
 Rajan Simkhada (born 1977), Nepali entrepreneur
 Rajan Singh, Indian politician
 Rajan Sippy, Indian actor
 Rajan Somasundaram, Indian composer
 Rajan Sushant (born 1955), Indian politician
 Rajan Tiwari, Indian legislator
 Rajan Vichare (born 1961), Indian politician

Notable people with this surname
 Amol Rajan (born 1983), Indian-born British journalist and broadcaster
 Chhota Rajan (born 1959), Indian criminal and mobster
 Raghuram Rajan (born 1963), Indian economist
 Anna Rajan (born 1991), Indian film actress
 Pampadi Rajan, famous Indian elephant

Given names
Surnames
Indian masculine given names
Surnames of Indian origin
Indian surnames